Adolf Topperwein (October 16, 1869 – March 4, 1962) with his wife toured as the Fabulous Topperweins as exhibition shooters.

Biography

He was born on October 16, 1869, in Boerne, Texas, to Johanna Bergman and Ferdinand Toepperwein.  In 1903 he married Elizabeth Servaty (known as "Plinky") of New Haven, Connecticut. In 1951 he stopped touring and opened a shooting camp in Leon Springs, Texas.

He died in San Antonio, Texas, on March 4, 1962. He was buried in Mission Burial Park.

Legacy
A Toepperwein museum was opened in May 1973 in San Antonio, Texas.

References

External links

1869 births
1962 deaths
American male sport shooters
People from Boerne, Texas